A Desperate Adventure is a 1924 American silent Western film directed by J. P. McGowan and starring Franklyn Farnum, Marie Walcamp, and Priscilla Bonner.

A nitrate print is preserved in the Library of Congress collection.

Plot summary 
A Secret Service agent is running down a band of smugglers known as "The Black Pete Gang".

Cast
 Franklyn Farnum
 Marie Walcamp
 Priscilla Bonner

Production 
Director J. P. McGowan had a reputation for being able to work with temperamental stars. Marie Walcamp had previously worked with McGowan on two short films in 1915, and the 18-chapter serial film The Red Glove in 1919.  A Desperate Adventure was one of two Westerns she worked on for McGowan in 1924, the second being Western Vengeance.

Release 
The film was released on June 20, or September 29, 1924.

References

External links
 
 

1924 films
Films directed by J. P. McGowan
1924 Western (genre) films
American black-and-white films
Silent American Western (genre) films
1920s American films